Asa Gordon "Ace" Wiley Jr. (1911 – March 11, 1995) was an American football and wrestling coach. Wiley was the head football coach at Waynesburg College—now known as Waynesburg University—in Waynesburg, Pennsylvania, serving for the 1946 season and compiling a record of 0–7–1.

Biography
Gordon was born in Wind Ridge, Pennsylvania. He attended Waynesburg College, where he captained the football team in 1932 and graduated in 1933. 

He subsequently earned master's degree from the University of Pittsburgh. Gordon was a schoolteacher and coached wrestling and other sports in Wind Ridge, Waynesburg, and Greensburg, Pennsylvania.

Head coaching record

College football

References

External links
 

1911 births
1995 deaths
Waynesburg Yellow Jackets football coaches
Waynesburg Yellow Jackets football players
High school football coaches in Pennsylvania
High school wrestling coaches in the United States
University of Pittsburgh alumni
Schoolteachers from Pennsylvania
People from Butler County, Pennsylvania
People from Greene County, Pennsylvania
Coaches of American football from Pennsylvania
Players of American football from Pennsylvania